111 may refer to:
111 (number)
111 BC
AD 111
111 (emergency telephone number)
111 (Australian TV channel)
Swissair Flight 111
111 (Her Majesty & the Wolves album)
111 (Željko Joksimović album)
NHS 111
(111) a Miller index for the crystal face plane formed by cutting off the corner equally along each axis
111 (MBTA bus)
111 (New Jersey bus)
111 (Pabllo Vittar album)

See also
III (disambiguation)
List of highways numbered 111
1/11 (disambiguation)
11/1 (disambiguation)
Roentgenium, synthetic chemical element with atomic number 111